"Last Words" is the 14th episode of the sixth season of the CBS sitcom How I Met Your Mother and the 126th episode overall. It aired on January 17, 2011.

Plot

Everyone goes to St. Cloud, Minnesota, Marshall's hometown, to attend the recently deceased Marvin Eriksen's funeral. Marshall is devastated, while his mother Judy keeps herself distracted by doing chores, having not eaten or slept in two days. Lily offers to help Judy, which results in Judy yelling at her before taking a nap. Meanwhile, Robin amazes the gang, as well as other people at the funeral, by providing them with virtually everything they need out of her purse from mobile chargers to drugs. She soon runs into rough waters when she accidentally gives alcohol to Marshall's teenaged cousin. Lily takes the blame and faces Judy's outrage to let the latter vent all her emotions. Finally, an exhausted Judy eats and rests.

Judy and Marshall learn that the funeral service will not be held by the Reverend, but by his son Trey (Danny Strong). The gang is surprised to learn that Trey used to bully Marshall in high school, especially since Trey is very short. Trey turns out to be extremely insensitive, though Judy agrees that Marvin Sr.'s last words should be the theme of the service. Marshall is reluctant to tell any such story as his last conversation with his father was over trivial issues, while the stories told by his mother and older brothers are very touching and inspiring. After charging his phone, which was out of power since before Marvin's death, Marshall discovers that he has a voicemail from his father. Marshall is wary about listening to the message, and asks the group what their father's last words to them would be should their fathers die; they realize that none of them would have anything special to say. Meanwhile, Ted and Barney unsuccessfully try to make Marshall laugh by showing him multiple videos of men getting hit in the groin in odd ways.

During the service, after hearing stories told by Judy, Marcus, and Marvin Jr., Marshall's turn to speak at the memorial service comes. He impulsively goes out to hear his father's message, which appears to be a pocket dial. An outraged Marshall says how much his father meant to him and how unfair it is that his last message to him was a "pocket dial". However, as he continues to rant, Marvin's voice jokes about his pocket dial error, before telling Marshall that he enjoyed his visit, and finally telling him "I love you."—and immediately asks for his foot cream as his rash had started to act up again. Deciding that his father's last words to him were "I love you", Marshall keeps his father's real last words to himself, instead telling everyone of how when he last saw his father he had told him to rent Crocodile Dundee 3.

Judy thanks Lily for what she has done during the course of the wake while making one last crude joke at Lily's expense, stating that it will be the last time, apparently resolving their strained relationship. After reflecting on the service, Ted, Lily, and Robin call their fathers to have meaningful conversations with them. Meanwhile, Barney calls his mother and tells her that he is ready to meet his father.

Production
This is the first episode since the season one finale, "Come On", to not have a cold opening; instead, it starts with the opening credits.

Eric Braeden was set to reprise his role as Robin's father, but backed out at the last minute, claiming that his cameo appearance was not "substantial" enough. This led to Neil Patrick Harris calling him out over Twitter, and Braedan later responding back in the media. The part was recast with Ray Wise.

Chris Elliott reprises his role as Lily's father, but does not appear on-screen; his brief cameo just consists of a voiceover as Lily is talking to him over the phone.

Carter Bays stated that they intended to bring back Bill Fagerbakke as Marshall's father in future episodes, but during flashbacks. He later appeared in several episodes.

Danny Strong appears in this episode.  Perhaps his best-known role is as Jonathan Levinson on Buffy the Vampire Slayer alongside Alyson Hannigan.

Critical response
Reviews for the episode were highly positive.

Donna Bowman of The A.V. Club gave the episode an A, noting it "[u]npretentious, unobtrusive, funny, balanced, and shot through with genuine feeling and unexpected grace".

Robert Canning of IGN gave the episode a rating of 8.5 out of 10. He said the episode built up on Bad News' momentum and had more roles in store for the rest of the main characters, but criticized Barney and Ted's efforts to lighten up Marshall as weak and worse during a funeral.

DeAnn Welker of Television Without Pity graded the episode at A.

Henry Hanks of CNN.com's Marquee Blog compared the episode's impact to that of The Mary Tyler Moore Show episode "Chuckles Bites the Dust" and the first episode of NewsRadio after Phil Hartman's death in 1998.

Ratings 
The episode achieved the highest ratings of season 6, at 10.51 million viewers.

References

External links 
 

How I Met Your Mother (season 6) episodes
2011 American television episodes
Television episodes about funerals